Theory of Love is a 2019 Thai television series starring Atthaphan Phunsawat (Gun) and Jumpol Adulkittiporn (Off).

Directed by Nuttapong Mongkolsawas and produced by GMMTV, the series was one of the thirteen television series for 2019 launched by GMMTV in their "Wonder Th13teen" event on 5 November 2018. It premiered on GMM 25 and LINE TV on 1 June 2019, airing on Saturdays at 21:25 ICT and 23:00 ICT, respectively. The series concluded on 17 August 2019.

Plot 
The story is about third year film student Third (Atthaphan Phunsawat) who has feelings for his friend Khai (Jumpol Adulkittiporn) for three years with a result of painful unrequited love. Third decides to stop his feelings no matter how difficult it may be. But when Third decides to move on, Khai incidentally realizes that he also has feelings for Third.

Cast and characters 
Below are the cast of the series:

Main 
 Atthaphan Phunsawat (Gun) as Third
 Jumpol Adulkittiporn (Off) as Khai
 Nawat Phumphotingam (White) as Two
 Chinnarat Siriphongchawalit (Mike) as Bone

Supporting 
 Pirapat Watthanasetsiri (Earth) as Aun
 Sara Legge as Paan
 Neen Suwanamas as Lyn
 Patara Eksangkul (Foei) as Chaine
 Supakan Benjaarruk (Nok) as Ching Ching
 Latkamon Pinrojkirati (Pim)

Guest role 
 Alysaya Tsoi (Alice) (Ep. 1)
 Benjamin Joseph Varney as Ton (Ep. 6-7)
 Thanaboon Wanlopsirinun (Na) as Gab, Paan's Boyfriend (Ep. 8-9, 11-12)
 Jiratpisit Jaravijit (Boom) as a boy in the bar (Ep. 11)
 Sutthipha Kongnawdee (Noon) as Bone's girlfriend (Ep. 12)
 Sureeyaret Yakaret (Prigkhing) as Fahsai
 Patnicha Kulasingh (Plai) as Nong Som
 Kris Songsamphant as an actor auditioning for the play (Ep. 7)

Stand By Me 

On 26 October 2020, GMMTV announced a special episode of the said series with the title "Stand By Me" which aired on 28 October 2020.

Soundtrack

Reception

Thailand television ratings 
In the table below,  represent the lowest ratings and  represents the highest rating.

Awards and nominations

International broadcast 
Japan – On 28 September 2020,  announced that it had acquired distribution rights of three television series from GMMTV which included the said series. It is scheduled to be distributed locally in Japanese subtitles by early 2021.
Philippines – The series was among the five GMMTV television series acquired by ABS-CBN Corporation, as announced by Dreamscape Entertainment on 10 September 2020. All episodes were made available for streaming via iWantTFC on 7 December 2020.

References

External links 
 Theory of Love on GMM 25 website 
 Theory of Love  on LINE TV
 
 GMMTV

Television series by GMMTV
Thai boys' love television series
Thai romantic comedy television series
2019 Thai television series debuts
2019 Thai television series endings
GMM 25 original programming
2010s LGBT-related comedy television series